Dennis Ellera "Denok" Miranda (born July 14, 1982), is a Filipino professional basketball coach and former player. He is the head coach for the FEU Tamaraws. He played majority of his career in the Philippine Basketball Association (PBA). He was drafted third overall by Coca-Cola Tigers during the 2005 PBA draft.

PBA career

Coca-Cola Tigers
Miranda played for the Coca-Cola Tigers for two seasons and averaged 8.1 points per game, 4.1 rebounds per game, and 4.4 assists per game.

Sta. Lucia Realtors
In the 2006–07 Philippine Cup, Miranda was traded to the Sta. Lucia Realtors with Manny Ramos and the Coca-Cola Tigers' 2008 second round pick in exchange for Alex Cabagnot, Ricky Calimag, and Kenneth Duremdes. He, Paolo Mendoza, Joseph Yeo and Ryan Reyes shared minutes at the guards positions. He was one of the key players in the championship team that defeated Purefoods in 2007-08.

San Miguel Beermen/Petron Blaze Boosters
Before the start of the 2009–10 PBA season, he was traded to the San Miguel Beermen for Sta. Lucia's future draft picks.

GlobalPort Batang Pier
He was traded to the GlobalPort Batang Pier for Chris Ross. However, he never played for GlobalPort in the 2013–14 season, so he was reacquired by Barako Bull.

Barako Bull
Miranda was traded by GlobalPort to the Barako Bull Energy in exchange for the sixth pick in the 2013 PBA draft, RR Garcia, who would later play with him for Barako.

Second coming to GlobalPort
He was traded by Barako Bull along with a 2016 second round pick, this time to GlobalPort which gave up Sol Mercado.

Talk 'N Text Tropang Texters
Miranda was traded to Talk 'N Text Tropang Texters for Jay Washington. He was later released by the newly named TNT KaTropa.

Blackwater Elite
Miranda signed with the Blackwater Elite for a short term contract during the 2016 Governors' Cup.

PBA career statistics

Correct as of September 18, 2016

Season-by-season averages
 
|-
| align=left | 
| align=left | Coca-Cola
| 34 ||	27.7 || .414 || .188 || .593 || 3.0 ||	3.2 ||	.9 ||	.1 ||	7.3
|-
| align=left | 
| align=left | Coca-Cola / Sta. Lucia
| 41 ||	30.7 || .430 || .216 || .614 || 4.1 ||	4.4 ||	.8 ||	.2 ||	8.2
|-
| align=left | 
| align=left | Sta. Lucia
| 54 ||	29.8 || .425 || .222 || .657 || 3.4 ||	4.4 ||	1.2 ||	.0 ||	7.1
|-
| align=left | 
| align=left | Sta. Lucia
| 45 ||	30.7 || .439 || .323 || .600 || 3.2 ||	4.4 ||	.4 ||	.2 ||	7.3
|-
| align=left | 
| align=left | San Miguel
| 49 ||	15.4 || .409 || .263 || .662 || 1.8 ||	2.3 ||	.4 ||	.0 ||	5.1
|-
| align=left | 
| align=left | San Miguel
| 47 ||	15.0 || .463 || .233 || .637 || 1.9 ||	1.9 ||	.3 ||	.0 ||	5.6
|-
| align=left | 
| align=left | Petron
| 43 ||	23.4 || .475 || .262 || .674 || 2.8 ||	3.1 ||	.7 ||	.0 ||	8.4
|-
| align=left | 
| align=left | Petron
| 39 ||	17.0 || .481 || .348 || .631 || 2.2 ||	2.9 ||	.5 ||	.0 ||	6.0
|-
| align=left | 
| align=left | Barako Bull
| 29 ||	26.7 || .358 || .309 || .739 || 3.1 ||	3.6 ||	.3 ||	.0 ||	9.5
|-
| align=left | 
| align=left | Barako Bull / GlobalPort
| 34 ||	19.6 || .404 || .275 || .714 || 2.0 ||	2.1 ||	.7 ||	.2 ||	7.3
|-
| align=left | 
| align=left | TNT / Blackwater
| 20 ||	14.2 || .366 || .217 || .682 || 1.6 ||	1.9 ||	.4 ||	.1 ||	4.0
|-class=sortbottom
| align=center colspan=2 | Career
| 435 || 23.1 || .428 || .270 || .650 || 2.7 ||	3.2 ||	.6 ||	.1 ||	6.9

References

External links
Player Profile
PBA-Online! Profile

1982 births
Living people
Barako Bull Energy players
Basketball players from Quezon
Blackwater Bossing players
FEU Tamaraws basketball coaches
FEU Tamaraws basketball players
Filipino men's basketball coaches
Filipino men's basketball players
Maharlika Pilipinas Basketball League players
NorthPort Batang Pier players
Point guards
Powerade Tigers draft picks
Powerade Tigers players
San Miguel Beermen players
Shooting guards
Sta. Lucia Realtors players
TNT Tropang Giga players